Mark Robinson is an Australian sports journalist. He is the chief football writer for Melbourne's Herald Sun newspaper, appears on the 1116 SEN radio station's pre-match Australian Football League (AFL) discussion and co-hosts Fox Footy's AFL 360 television program.

Career
A junior footballer for the Sandhurst Football Club in Bendigo, Robinson began covering football in 1992. Throughout his career he has predominantly covered Australian rules football and has been the chief football writer for the Herald Sun since 2012 following the retirement of Mike Sheahan.

Robinson has co-hosted the AFL 360 television program on Fox Footy since 2010.

Robinson was a panelist on many of the 1116 SEN radio station's shows, including The Run Home and match day AFL discussion until the end of the 2017 season

In 2018, Robinson joined 3AW as a panelist on the Sunday Sport show alongside Daniel Harford and Jimmy Bartel.

In the latter half of 2021, Robinson experienced multiple cardiac episodes which required medical attention, including open-heart surgery.

Controversies and feuds
Robinson has been rumoured to have been involved in a variety of verbal and physical altercations with several fellow journalists, including Damian Barrett, Andy Maher and Michael Warner.

In June 2017, Robinson tweeted about Collingwood footballer Alex Fasolo when his struggles with severe depression became known, suggesting that the quickness of Fasolo's recovery was an indication he was faking his illness. He later deleted the tweet and apologised for what he said, with the Collingwood president later saying that Robinson ignored the club's medical advice when contacting Fasolo.

References

Journalists from Melbourne
Australian radio personalities
Australian rules football commentators
Australian sports journalists
Living people
Sandhurst Football Club players
Year of birth missing (living people)
People from Bendigo